Carmo is a municipality in the Brazilian state of Rio de Janeiro. Its nickname is the Cidade Bela (Beautiful City).

Geography 

Its current population is estimated to be more than 19,000 inhabitants, of which 72.3% live in the suburban area.

The municipality neighbors Sumidouro, Cantagalo, Duas Barras, Sapucaia, as well as bordering Além Paraíba.

Part of the city is situated in the basin of the Paquequer River, one of the last tributaries of the Paraíba do Sul that has little aquatic pollution.

References

Municipalities in Rio de Janeiro (state)